Stonehouse is an English surname. Notable people with the surname include:

Arts and entertainment
Cathy Stonehouse, British-Canadian poet
Ethel Nhill Victoria Stonehouse (1883–1964), Australian novelist and poet
Ruth Stonehouse (1892–1941), American actress

Military
Brian Stonehouse (1918–1998), British Special Operations Executive
Herbert Arthur Stonehouse (1909–1984), British naval officer

Politics
Aaron Stonehouse, Australian politician
John Stonehouse (1925–1988), British politician who faked his disappearance
Stonehouse (TV series) - 2023 British TV series based on John Stonehouse's life.

Religion
George Stonehouse (1808–1871), Baptist minister in South Australia
Ned Stonehouse (1902–1962), New Testament scholar

Science
Bernard Stonehouse (1926–2014), British polar scientist
Nicola Stonehouse, British professor of molecular virology

Sport
Jimmy Stonehouse (born 1964), South African rugby union coach
Ken Stonehouse (born 1956), Australian rules footballer
Kevin Stonehouse (born 1959), English footballer
Ryan Stonehouse (born 1999), American football player

Other
Alpheus George Barnes Stonehouse (1862–1931), circus owner
Kenneth Stonehouse (1908–1943), journalist

English-language surnames